The Space Warfighting Analysis Center (SWAC) is a direct reporting unit in the United States Space Force responsible  for conducting analysis, modeling, wargaming, and experimentation to create operational concepts and force design guidance for the service. It is the Space Force's counterpart to the Air Force Warfighting Integration Capability and United States Army Futures Command. It is headquartered at Washington, D.C.

The establishment of SWAC was ordered by Chief of Space Operations John W. Raymond. Originally planned as Space Warfighting Integration Center, Vice Chief of Space Operations David D. Thompson was tasked to focus with its establishment upon taking office. Raymond approved the organizational design of SWAC on  8 March 2021. It was activated on 5 April 2021.

SWAC was criticized by the House Committee on Appropriations in a report as being duplicative of the Space Security and Defense Program (SSDP), refusing the $37 million budget request for the organization. It is expected to complete its first architecture study, which focuses on missile warning, missile tracking, and missile defense architecture.

List of directors

References

See also 
 United States Army Futures Command
 United States Space Force

United States Space Force
United States Space Force personnel